Suresh P. Sethi is Eugene McDermott Chair Professor of Operations Management and director of the Center for Intelligent Supply Networks (C4ISN) at The University of Texas at Dallas. He has contributed significantly in the fields of manufacturing and operations management, finance and economics, marketing, industrial engineering, operations research, and optimal control.  He is well known for his developments of the Sethi advertising model and DNSS Points, and for his textbook on optimal control.

He has received several prestigious honors and awards for his contributions. Two conferences have been organized in his honor: in Aix en Provence in 2005 and at UT Dallas in 2006 with Harry M. Markowitz, a 1990 Nobel Laureate in Economics, as the keynote speaker. Also, two books have been edited in his honor.

His past and present editorial positions include Departmental Editor of Production and Operations Management, Corresponding Editor of SIAM Journal on Control and Optimization, and Associate Editor of Operations Research, M&SOM, and Automatica.

Education
Suresh Sethi received his Ph.D. in Operations Research from Carnegie Mellon University and was Post-doctoral Fellow at Stanford University under the supervision of George B. Dantzig. He has B. Tech. with Honors in Mechanical Engineering from Indian Institute of Technology Bombay, M.S. in Industrial Administration from Carnegie Mellon University, and MBA from Washington State University.

Academic career
Sethi is Eugene McDermott Chair Professor of Operations Management and director of the Center for Intelligent Supply Networks (C4ISN) at The University of Texas at Dallas. He has also taught at Rice University, University of Toronto, and Carnegie Mellon University. At University of Toronto, he was General Motors Research Professor (1988–92) and Connaught Senior Research Fellow (1984–85).

Honors and awards
 Alumni Achievement Award, Tepper School, Carnegie Mellon University (2015)
 President, Production and Operations Management Society (2012)
 Honored by POMS in its journal POM(2011)
 Charter Fellow of the Society for Industrial and Applied Mathematics (2009)
 Distinguished Alum of IIT Bombay (2008)
 Conferences organized in his honor in 2005 and 2006
 Books edited in his honor in 2005 and 2006
 Fellow of Production and Operations Management Society (2005)
 Wickham-Skinner Best Paper Award at The 2nd World Conference on POM, 15th Annual Production and Operations Management Conference held in Cancun, Mexico (2004)
 INFORMS Fellow (2003), AAAS Fellow (2003)
 IEEE Fellow (2002)
  Outstanding Contribution in Education, Greater Dallas Indo-American Chamber of Commerce (2001)
 Fellow of the IC² Institute at the University of Texas at Austin (2000)
 Fellow of the New York Academy of Sciences (1999)
 C.Y. O’Connor Fellow, Curtin University, Perth, Australia (1998)
 Award of Merit, Canadian Operational Research Society (1996)
 Fellow of the Royal Society of Canada (1994)
 Listed in Canadian Who's Who, Marquis Who's Who in the World and Marquis Who's Who in the America
 Erdős Number 3: List of people by Erdős number

References

External links
 Homepage of Suresh P. Sethi
 Suresh P. Sethi’s  homepage at UT Dallas
 SSRN Author Page of Suresh P. Sethi
 Author Page of Suresh P. Sethi at MathSciNet
 Suresh P. Sethi at the Mathematics Genealogy Project
 Author Page of Suresh P. Sethi at RePec/EconPapers

American operations researchers
20th-century American mathematicians
21st-century American mathematicians
Tepper School of Business alumni
Carnegie Mellon University alumni
Rice University faculty
Systems scientists
21st-century American economists
Fellows of the Royal Society of Canada
IIT Bombay alumni
Living people
Year of birth missing (living people)
Fellows of the Institute for Operations Research and the Management Sciences